The 1958 SFR Yugoslavia Chess Championship was the 13th edition of SFR Yugoslav Chess Championship. Held in Sarajevo, SFR Yugoslavia, SR Bosnia & Herzegovina. The tournament was won by Svetozar Gligorić and Borislav Ivkov.

References

External links 
 http://www.perpetualcheck.com/show/show.php?lan=cp&data=Y1958001&job=r1
 https://www.365chess.com/tournaments/YUG-ch_13th_1958/25433

Yugoslav Chess Championships
1958 in chess
Chess